Alan Read (born 21 September 1956) is a writer and professor of theatre at King's College London.  Read is known as a theatre theorist and cultural activist, with scholarly interests in ethics and the everyday, performed communities, event architecture,  and subjectivities of capitalism.  Read's work stands as a critique of modernist theatrical orthodoxy critically contesting Peter Brook's idealism of the ‘empty space' awaiting its theatre, a tabula rasa for professionals to enter and exit at will.  Read counter intuitively perceives theatre to have been superseded in that populated place by the quotidian performances of everyday life, those that remain for good and ill. Read took up this provocative critique on the National Theatre stage in London in 1994 in public dialogue with Brook's space-designer Jean-Guy Lecat, and joins others in his scepticism of the colonial fantasy of theatre's ‘empty space', including most assertively Rustom Bharucha in Theatre & The World (1993).

Life 
Born in Southend-on-Sea, the posthumous child of William Alan Read, and Veronica Read, he was educated at Westcliff High School. He obtained his bachelor's degree from University of Exeter in 1979. He took his PhD at the University of Washington, Seattle between 1979 and 1981, and was awarded his doctorate in 1989, following a decade working at the Rotherhithe Theatre Workshop in the Docklands area of South East London.

Read is the partner of the artist Beryl Robinson. They live in West London and the Commune of Truinas. They have two daughters Florence who is a writer,  and Hermione a fashion designer.

Career 
Read is the author of Theatre & Everyday Life: An Ethics of Performance (1993),  Theatre, Intimacy & Engagement: The Last Human Venue (2008),  Theatre in the Expanded Field: Seven Approaches to Performance (2014), Theatre & Law (2016). and The Dark Theatre: A Book About Loss (2020). During a period of directing the Talks programme at the Institute of Contemporary Arts in London at the ‘height of the theory' in the 1990s,  Read edited two volumes: The Fact of Blackness: Frantz Fanon and Visual Representation, with original artwork by Steve McQueen (1996), and Architecturally Speaking: Practices of Art, Architecture and the Everyday (2000).

Read taught at Dartington College of Arts in the 1980s, coordinating the Council of Europe Workshop on Theatre and Communities with Colette King and Peter Hulton in 1981–1983,  and working at the Rotherhithe Theatre Workshop with David Slater  through the rest of the decade.  In the early 1990s he moved to Barcelona writing on street ceremony, gegants, castells and corre foc (human-dragon fire runners), completing the monograph Theatre & Everyday Life (1993) documenting these ethnographies of the everyday and their relations to risk and safety.

In 1993 Read curated the London International Festival of Theatre Daily Dialogues, a sequence of 21 daily public seminars with artists, theorists and theatre companies engaged in the LIFT programme.  Read reprised the work biennially for successive LIFT festivals over the next decade, concluding notably with the day-long symposium ‘Voice Ruin Play' (2001) that brought together for the first time Romeo Castellucci and Societas Raffaello Sanzio with key figures in the UK theatre community.

Read was appointed Director of Talks at the Institute of Contemporary Arts (ICA) in the mid 1990s working alongside Helena Reckitt.  Together they were responsible for curating and chairing more than 500 public talks over four years, with key figures in the cultural field,  including philosophers Jacques Derrida, Jean Baudrillard, Judith Butler, Alphonso Lingis,  race theorists Homi Bhabha, bell hooks, Paul Gilroy, musicians Laurie Anderson, Mark E Smith, Patti Smith, novelists Bret Easton Ellis, Nadine Gordimer, SE Hinton, Laurie Moore, Tahar Ben Jelloun, film directors Alejandro Jodorowsky, Raul Ruiz, Wong Kar-wai, artists Mary Kelly, Vija Celmins, John Currin, Orlan, cultural theorists Beatriz Colomina, John Berger, Sander Gilman, and space makers Doreen Massey, Richard Sennett and Edward Soja. Talks series such as Spaced Out (Architecture), Addressing Dressing (Fashion), Uncanny Encounters (Psychoanalytic theory), The Scapegoat (Cultural theory), Incarcerated with Artaud and Genet (Theatrical archaeology), Working With Fanon (Race and radical psychiatry),  influenced the way cultural theory was publicly addressed through the 1990s and the ‘talks' industry that was to follow at Tate Modern, The Institute of Ideas, The School of Life, TED and Intelligence Squared.

In 1997 Read was appointed the first Professor of Theatre at Roehampton Institute (subsequently Roehampton University) and then in 2006 the first Professor of Theatre in the 180-year history of King's College London.  At King's College, Read established the Performance Foundation,  conceived and built the Anatomy Theatre & Museum in collaboration with the Centre for e Research (2010),  planned and built the Inigo Rooms in the East Wing of Somerset House with the support of King's Business (2012), and initiated King's Cultural Partners, latterly Kings Cultural Institute under the directorship of Deborah Bull (2012).

Read was awarded an Honorary Fellowship by Dartington College of Arts in 2003,  an Arts and Humanities Research Board five-year Major Award (2000–2005),  a Leverhulme Major Award (2010–2013),  mentored the last of the AHRC Creative Fellowships with Greg Whelan of Lone Twin (2011–2016),  and secured an EPSRC three-year Bridging the Gaps Award with Mark Miodownik and the King's Material Library, (2011–2014).  Read is Faculty Professor of the University of California Berkeley, for whom he established the annual London Theatre Capital Programme,  and since 1991 has been an affiliated Professor of Boston University teaching theatre students from coast to coast US campuses.

Artistic collaborations 

Read's collaborations with the theatre companies Het Werkteater,  Societas Raffaello Sanzio  Forced Entertainment,  Goat Island,  Battersea Arts Centre, Forster & Heighes, the curatorial producers Artangel, and the artist-activists Platform, have been long-term relations that took the form of advocacy, infrastructural support, advisory roles, talks-curation and engagement between theatre makers, the academy and the public realm.

Read has performed with William Pope. L as part of ‘The Frequently Asked' curated by Tim Etchells and Adrian Heathfield at Tanzquartier Vienna in 2007,  designed sound work for Massimo Bartolini's ‘The Human Voices', a site specific work in a disused 1939 ENAL pool in Vercelli, Italy, as part of PSi ‘Affective Archives', 2010,  created lecture performances such as ‘The Poor Law' to mark the centenary of Daniel Paul Schreber's death, at Castle Sonnenstein on the River Elbe 2011, read his unreliable memoir The White Estuary: Man with the Reason of History Missing over three six-hour sessions as part of PSi 18 Leeds (2012), participated in Tuija Kokkonen's all-night performance ‘Chronopolitics with Dogs and Trees' at Stanford University (2013), occupied Tate Modern with his performance teach-in ‘The English Garden Effect' as part of the climate crisis Deadline Festival 2015, exchanged public correspondence with the philosopher Cecilia Sjoholm for the TOPublic Festival (2016) , and turned the institution of the lecture inside out for Justyna Scheuring's performance ‘The Past Is Ahead of Us' at King's College London in 2016.  Read is an essayist and reader for radio broadcast including for BBC Radio 4, Plato's Cave (2012),  Dreadful Trade (2014),  and Soul Estuary (2016),  produced by Sarah Blunt with sound by Chris Watson.

Influence 

In support of radical inclusion in the field Read's work simultaneously engages theoretical study, performance practices and pedagogic commitments.  Steve Tompkins of the architectural practice Haworth Tompkins, has recognised the significance of Read's concepts of the everyday, cultural accretion, and event ghosting in their winning submissions for the Royal Court Theatre and Young Vic Theatre in London.  Tompkins has written: “Read has been an excellent sounding board, a provocative collaborator, an encouraging enthusiast and a constructive critic for my work.”  Indeed, what Susannah Clapp of The Observer has described as ‘Tompkinsesque' characteristics of theatrical design, could be said to share significant features with Read's long running concerns for archaeologies of site and the theatre as memory machine.

The Homo Novus Festival in Riga took up Read's concept of ‘The Last Human Venue' as an overarching curatorial umbrella for their 2013 international festival with artists including Monika Pormale, Nomadi and Valters Sillis responding to Read's idea of performance at the end of its ecological tether measuring the humans' distance from their inevitable extinction.  The Chicago-based Every House Has A Door adopted Read's concept of Abandoned Practices,  itself following the work of Isabelle Stengers on eliminativism   in an annual summer school in Prague/Chicago and a project web site www.abandonedpractices.org.  The Artist/Activist group Platform,  and filmmakers Desperate Optimists,  have both responded to Read's conception of ‘civility' and the problematic question of the ‘civic centre' with work in a variety of media including peripatetic performance and film.

Read's work is anthologised and widely referenced including Lizbeth Goodman's featuring of Theatre & Everyday Life in The Routledge Reader in Politics and Performance (2000),  with subsequent work on definitions of performance in Adrian Heathfield's Live: Art and Performance (2004),  the miniature and the infra-thin in Richard Gough's A Performance Cosmology (2006),  friendship in Lone Twin's Good Luck Everybody (2013),  vegetal life in Patricia Vieira's The Green Thread (2015),  repetition in Eirini Kartsaki's On Repetition (2016),  and the financialisation of childhood in Performance Research ‘On Childhood' (2017).

Read's work is frequently cited with key figures in the field both critiquing and referencing his ideas: Shannon Jackson singling out Read's concepts of ‘re-association and reassembly' (after Bruno Latour) in Social Works (2011),  Nigel Thrift adopting Read's origination of ‘showciology' in ‘The Transformation of Contemporary Capitalism' (2009), Joe Kelleher's consideration of Read's conception of politics in Theatre & Politics (2009), Hansen and Kozel on Read's figuring of ethics in ‘Embodied Imagination' (2007),  and Nicholas Ridout's reflections on Read's theory of theatrical failure in Stage Fright, Animals and Other Theatrical Problems (2006).

Recent work 

Read's more recent work on theatrical ‘immunity', reversing the communitarian presumption of performance, might be considered a logical inversion of the tenets of Theatre & Everyday Life rather than a negation of them.  In this work Read has challenged those with investments in terminologies of social theatre, community theatre and political theatre to act upon more nuanced distinctions between aesthetic, cultural and political priorities.  Read figures the ‘emaciated spectator', in critical relation to Jacques Ranciere's voluntaristic ‘emancipated spectator', measuring their distance from others in the audience and gauging their relations with the immersive event that seeks their submission to its spectacle.  This agency of measurement is always operable in relation to an ending, aesthetic (the show always ends), and ecological (human extinction is inevitable), that invites Read to name the theatre ‘the last human venue'.

Read's gently cynical tone, especially in his widespread reviewing of the work of leading figures in the disciplinary field, such as Richard Schechner and Peggy Phelan, Tracy Davies and Susan Bennett, Ric Knowles, and monumental productions such as The Sultan's Elephant by Royal de Luxe, has teased and challenged those with cultural capital, seeking the funny bone of a discipline that has made so much currency from others' labours. The same reviews encourage the writer Caridad Svich to describe Read as ‘inimitable'.

Read has attracted less benign responses for his longstanding polemical critique of identity politics that fall short of intersectional ambitions, Read maintaining that ‘radical particularity' inadvertently obscures the politically inclusive urgency of a ‘general theory' of class disempowerment. Equally his work on ‘pseudo action', the deceptive, voluntaristic vocabulary of a theatre wish-fulfilling its social and political purpose in the place of a slower but more honest political agency, has been forcefully countered by a number of commentators, the most prominent of whom has been Janelle Reinelt in her valedictory lecture to the field at Warwick University in 2015, ‘What I Came to Say' (2015).  Read in turn responds to these claims of political retreat in his keynote to the Performance Philosophy Convention at the Prague Academy in 2017, ‘The Dark Theatre: Ethnographies of the Capitalocene' in which he retraces his steps over three decades of political and theatrical commitment to the neighbourhood and dockland warehouse in which his thinking about everyday life and theatre were grounded.

Bibliography
 (1984) An Educational Theatre Project: The Shadow of Theatre.''' Dartington: Theatre Papers/Arts Archives.
 (1984) Het Werkteater: An Actors' Cooperative. Dartington: Theatre Papers/Arts Archives
 (1993) Theatre & Everyday Life: An Ethics of Performance. London: Routledge.
 (1994) Peter Brook: Platform Papers. London: National Theatre.
 (1996) The Fact of Blackness: Frantz Fanon and Visual Representation. Seattle: Bay Press.
 (2000) Architecturally Speaking: Practices of Art, Architecture and the Everyday. London: Routledge.
 (2000) On Animals. London: Taylor and Francis
 (2003) Epitaph: Societas Raffaello Sanzio.  Milan: Ubu Libri.
 (2004) On Civility. London: Taylor and Francis.
 (2008) Theatre, Intimacy & Engagement: The Last Human Venue. Houndmills: Palgrave.
 (2014) Theatre in the Expanded Field: Seven Approaches to Performance. London: Bloomsbury.
 (2016) Theatre & Law. Houndmills: Palgrave.
 (2020) The Dark Theatre: A Book About Loss''. Abingdon: Routledge.

References

Further reading
 Joe Kelleher on Theatre, Intimacy & Engagement, The Drama Review, 2010
 William Worthen on Theatre in the Expanded Field, Modern Drama, 2015
 Heike Gehring on Theatre in the Expanded Field, South African Theatre Journal, 2016
 George Hunka on Theatre in the Expanded Field, PAJ: A Journal of Performance and Art, 2015
 Institute of International Visual Arts on The Fact of Blackness: Frantz Fanon and Visual Representation, 2008

External links
 Alan Read on Childhood, Bodies and Perception at Tate Modern, 2016.
 Stage Hands: The Manual Labour of Performance. Inaugural Lecture, King's College London, 2012.
 Liverpool Biennial, 2016: Lay Theatre and the Eruption of the Audience: Keynote Talk
 Alan Read on the Allied invasion of Iraq, 2003
 An Exchange of letters with Cecilia Sjoholm for TO Public, 2016
 ‘And nothing is, but what is not', Introduction to Chiara Guidi, King's College London, 2014
 Homo Novus Festival: 2013, The Last Human Venue
 Law and the Curated Body, Osgoode Hall Law School, Toronto, 2015
 Hijacking Wonders, Hetveem Theatre, Amsterdam, 2011
 Art As Knowing: A Public Conversation about Art, Ideas and Practice. University of Minnesota, Institute for Advanced Study, 2007.
 http://ias.umn.edu/2007/03/23/art-as-knowing/
 Thinking The City: Multidisciplinary Views on Urban Life and Culture, Chaired by Doreen Massey, Tate Modern, 2001, Part 5, Alan Read

1956 births
Living people
21st-century British male writers
Academics of King's College London
People from Southend-on-Sea
20th-century British male writers
Alumni of the University of Exeter
People educated at Westcliff High School for Boys
University of Washington alumni
Academics of the University of Roehampton